Umakant Premanand Shah is a scholar from India.

Life
Umakant was born in Baroda on 20 March 1915. He completed his doctoral thesis on 'Elements of Jaina Art'. He became the deputy director of Oriental Institute, Baroda in 1954. He became the head of Ramayana Project at the institute in 1965.

Shah died in November 1988.

Works
Umakant P Shah is credited with 62 works in 147 publications in 2 languages and 951 library holdings.

His works on Jainism includes "Jaina-rūpa-maṇḍana: Jaina iconography".

References

Citations

Sources
 
 

Scholars of Jainism